A Gray State is a 2017 documentary film directed by Erik Nelson and executive produced by Werner Herzog, first broadcast on the A&E Network. It explores the death of aspiring filmmaker David Crowley and the murders of his wife and child in 2014. The film tells the story of Crowley's military service in the Middle East, his efforts to fund and make a film, and explores the circumstances surrounding the deaths. Crowley had been working on a feature film he called Gray State. Herzog and Nelson had previously worked together on 2005's Grizzly Man, which Nelson produced, and Herzog directed.

References

2017 films
2017 documentary films
American documentary films
2010s English-language films
2010s American films